Kalba Fort is an 18th century fort located inland of the coastal city of Kalba on the eastern seaboard of Sharjah, United Arab Emirates. It was restored as a museum and visitor attraction in April 2021.

History 
Originally constructed in 1745, additions were made to the structure of the mudbrick, gypsum and stone structure of the fort in 1820. The fort stands on the site of an original fortification captured by the Portuguese commander Gaspar Leite in March 1624 and is of an unusual construction, with buttressing indicating that it was perhaps developed from an original watchtower under Portuguese architectural influence. It represents one of a string of fortifications on the east coast of the Emirates with Portuguese origins, others being at Khor Fakkan, Al Badiyah and Dibba.

By 1829, the fort was described as 'a fort on the side of a creek into which boats of twenty to thirty tons can go' and Kalba itself as a town of some 200 inhabitants.

The fort was restored and originally opened as a heritage site in December 1996. It features a two-story murabaa or tower. It encompasses an area of some 1,435 square metres and remains date the surrounding village houses back some 500 years. The latest restoration was originally scheduled for completion at the end of 2020. It was restored as a museum and visitor attraction by the ruler of Sharjah, Sultan bin Mohammed Al Qasimi, in April 2021.

Bait Sheikh Saeed bin Hamad Al Qasimi
Adjacent to the fort is the Bait Sheikh Saeed bin Hamad Al Qasimi, a traditional house constructed between 1898 and 1901 and originally opened as a museum in December 1999. The house was also restored and reopened as a museum in April 2021.

References 

Forts in the United Arab Emirates
History of the United Arab Emirates